is a Japanese snowboarder.
 
He competed in the 2009, 2011, 2013, 2015 and 2017 FIS Snowboard World Championships, and in the 2018 Winter Olympics, in parallel giant slalom.

References

External links

1986 births
Living people
Japanese male snowboarders
Olympic snowboarders of Japan
Snowboarders at the 2018 Winter Olympics
21st-century Japanese people